Suicide Pact – You First is the fifth full-length album by the band Therapy?, and the first to be released by their third record company Ark21, following the demise of the band's previous label. It was released on 18 October 1999 and recorded at Great Linford Manor in Milton Keynes from 13 July to 15 August 1999. The album is easily their longest running record at 71 minutes.

The album was a move away from the pop sensibilities of their previous album, Semi-Detached, and was considered a dark and twisted effort, seemingly as a retort to the conditions and restrictions imposed upon them and other bands on major labels. Although the album garnered very little radio airplay, and only reached number 61 in the UK Albums Chart, it received mixed reviews in the press.

The album was released on CD and cassette. The US released limited edition CD-ROM included the video of "Little Tongues First".

Track listing
All songs written by Therapy?.

The Japanese edition featured two live tracks as bonuses, with album closer and hidden track "Whilst I Pursue My Way Unharmed" moved to the end of the second bonus track:

Singles
"Hate Kill Destroy" was released on 6 March 2000 with live versions of "Six Mile Water" and "Sister". This single was released in Germany only and a limited edition of 2000 copies. Live tracks recorded in Brussels, Belgium on 8 December 1999.
"Six Mile Water" was released in 2000 as a radio promotional single, featuring album and radio edits, as well as a live version, of the title track.

Promo videos
"Little Tongues First": directed by Nigel Rolfe

Personnel
Therapy?
 Andy Cairns – vocals, guitar
 Graham Hopkins – drums, backing vocals
 Michael McKeegan – bass, backing vocals
 Martin McCarrick – guitar, cello, vocals
with:
 Kimberley McCarrick – violin
Technical
 Head – producer, guitar
 Nigel Rolfe – photography
 Steve Gullick – photography
 Therapy?/Insect – design

Charts

References

1999 albums
Therapy? albums
Ark 21 Records albums